The 1990–91 Richmond Spiders men's basketball team represented the University of Richmond in National Collegiate Athletic Association (NCAA) Division I college basketball during the 1990–91 season. Richmond competed as a member of the Colonial Athletic Association (CAA) under head basketball coach Dick Tarrant and played its home games at the Robins Center.

Richmond finished second in the CAA regular-season standings with a 10–4 conference record, and won the CAA tournament to earn an automatic bid to the 1991 NCAA tournament. In the opening round, the Spiders became the first #15 seed to win an NCAA Tournament game. They defeated the seventh-ranked, #2 seed Syracuse Orangemen, 73–69, at Cole Field House in College Park, Maryland. Richmond lost in the second round to Temple, 77–64, to finish with a 22–10 record.

Roster

Schedule and results

|-
!colspan=9 style=| Regular season

      

  
  
 
 

 
 

  

|-
!colspan=9 style=| CAA Tournament

|-
!colspan=9 style=| NCAA Tournament

References

Richmond Spiders men's basketball seasons
Richmond
1990 in sports in Virginia
1991 in sports in Virginia
Richmond